Cocula ( "ondulated place") is a city and municipality in the Mexican state of Jalisco. According to the 2020 census, the population of the municipality was 29,267 with 16,550 inhabitants living in the city. Other important towns in the municipality are Cofradía de la Luz, La Sauceda, and Santa Teresa.

Economy
The Cocula region is primarily agrarian in nature, growing not only corn, agave, sorghum, chickpeas, alfalfa, mangoes and is one of the nations top sugar cane producers; but also raising to a lesser degree,  pigs, poultry, goats, and cattle.  Cocula City is also the head of local commerce, with a wide range of specialized retailers of food, clothing, shoes, and construction materials, while also serving as the primary center for general services such as banks, hospitals, car repair shops and other services within the region, and its also home of many saddleries.

History

Cocula was called originally Cocollán or Cocolán, which has been interpreted to mean "ondulated place." Around the 12th century, some families of the Coca tribe who inhabited the Kingdom of Tonalá were forced to flee the area due to hostility towards them. A group guided by Huehuetztlatzin founded Cocollán in today's Acatlan de Juarez area.

Cocollán was destroyed at the beginning of the 16th century. They tried to establish themselves in the Tlajomulco area a few miles from there but were expelled by the local tribes. They ended up occupying the top of a mountain close to the original Cocollán site where they remained until the arrival of the Spaniards.

By 1520, Cocollán was an independent city under the rule of Chief Citlali (The Star). It had some tributary towns under its control like Acatlan, Villa Corona, Tizapanito, Xilotepetque and Tecolotlán. In 1521, the Spanish army under Alonso the Avalos conquered Cocollán and surrounding towns and incorporated them into the Avalos Province. A few years later, Franciscan friars persuaded the indigenous inhabitants of the city to relocate to a valley nearby, which is its present location. This is believed to have happened in 1532. There are still remains of the old city, which is referred to as Cocula Vieja (Old Cocula).

In 1833, Cocula was declared a city, Cocula is best known as the birthplace of mariachi.

Culture
Cocula is referred to as "La Cuna del Mariachi," or "The Cradle of Mariachi," given that mariachi music originated there in the 19th century. As one enters or exits Cocula, two large arches, featuring two guitars or violins, bear the inscription "Bienvenidos a Cocula, Cuna Mundial del Mariachi." Many well known mariachi groups have come from Cocula and surrounding areas. A famous Mexican Artist named Jorge Negrete sang a song called "Cocula" that talks about this town and how mariachi originated there.

Government

Municipal presidents

Gallery

References

External links
Official Municipal Government Website  (Spanish)

Municipalities of Jalisco